Marino House and gardens was a Georgian house and estate in Marino in the northern suburbs of Dublin, Ireland, constructed sometime around 1755 and later remodeled by Sir William Chambers for the 1st Earl of Charlemont. Chambers later also designed Charlemont House on nearby Rutland Square (now Parnell Square) for Lord Charlemont.

The house, which was demolished in the 1920s, was named for Marino in modern day Italy,  which the Earl visited on his grand tour of Europe. The later suburb of Marino took its name from the house and estate.

History
The house was designed and constructed following Lord Charlemont's return from his Grand Tour of Italy, Greece, Turkey, Egypt and France. The house replaced an earlier Donnycarney House on the site which was acquired by a Thomas Adderley, the step-father of the Earl of Charlemont following his mother's second marriage.

The grounds of the house included the more famous folly, the Casino at Marino, constructed slightly later from 1755 onwards and completed around 1775.

The Christian Brothers bought Marino House in 1881 and moved their main Dublin base there from nearby Belvidere House in Drumcondra. Later, the Christian Brothers moved to the newly constructed St Mary's building from 1904. The funerary urns from the roof of Marino House which were designed by James Gandon were transferred to the roof of St. Mary's when the house was demolished around 1920.

In 1915, Dublin Corporation acquired much of the house and grounds in the surrounding area for the development of social housing and a new garden suburb; however, the outbreak of the First World War delayed the commencement of construction until 1924.

Other structures
Various follies and pieces of classical and neoclassical artwork were scattered throughout the house and grounds. Most notable among these were the Casino at Marino which is the only one still standing today. Other follies include the Gothic Room (with stained glass windows - constructed at the same time as the casino), the Gothic seat and the Hermitage.

The original Georgian entrance gate pillars (1770) designed by Sir William Chambers and Giovanni Battista Cipriani were relocated to Griffith Avenue and are still in existence today.

References

William Chambers buildings
Buildings and structures in Dublin (city)
Houses in the Republic of Ireland
Georgian architecture in Ireland
Demolished buildings and structures in Dublin